Gourlizon is a commune in the Finistère department of Brittany in north-western France.

Population
Inhabitants of Gourlizon are called in French
Gourlizonnais.

See also
Communes of the Finistère department

References

External links

Official website

Mayors of Finistère Association ;

Communes of Finistère